Chelan Lauren Simmons is a Canadian actress and former professional model. She is known for her role as Ashley Freund in Final Destination 3 (2006), Helen Shyres in Carrie (2002), Good Luck Chuck (2007), and Tucker & Dale vs. Evil (2010). She is also known for her roles in the television series It (1990), Wonderfalls (2004), Kyle XY (2006–2009), and The L.A. Complex (2012).

Personal life
Simmons was born in Vancouver, British Columbia, the middle child of three (one younger brother and an older sister). Simmons has been married to Greg Street since 2015. On June 1, 2016, Simmons gave birth to a daughter. Simmons filmed the TV movie Operation Christmas portraying a pregnant woman during her real life pregnancy. Simmons resides in Vancouver and Los Angeles. Outside of acting, Simmons is a dog lover and enjoys cooking.

Career
Simmons' parents wanted her to become an actress at the age of three but they waited until she turned five to pursue a career. She started modeling and appeared in commercials. Simmons made her official film debut in It (1990) as Laurie Anne Winterbarger. She went on to star in the award-nominated family film Bingo, her first theatrical release, and appeared in several television shows as a child star.

Simmons returned to acting seven years later, giving up her modeling career. Simmons played guest appearances on multiple shows before portraying recurring roles in the MTV show MTV'S Now What? and Crystal in Edgemont for 11 episodes. Simmons has also starred in a number of television films, including Stephen King's Carrie (2002). Due to Simmons' many roles in the horror genre, such as the television films Snakehead Terror and Chupacabra: Dark Seas, she is considered a modern-day scream queen.

In 2005, Simmons was cast in the comedy film The Long Weekend, her first theatrical release in over 10 years. The following year, Simmons starred in the 2006 horror film Final Destination 3, the third installment in the Final Destination franchise. Simmons portrayed the popular Ashley Freund, possibly her best-known role to date. The film received mixed reviews but was a success at the box office and was nominated for awards. It involved Simmons' first nude scene, which she initially didn't want to do. The script required her to be topless during a tanning booth scene. When she expressed her reluctance to director James Wong, he convinced her it was important because it made the scene more realistic, so she agreed. The set was closed off during filming and only the cameraman was present, so it made her and actress Crystal Lowe, who was also topless, feel more comfortable. Simmons also starred in the Direct-to-DVD sequel Dr. Dolittle 3 before appearing in small roles in the teen comedy John Tucker Must Die and the horror Wind Chill.

Simmons won the role of recurring character Hillary in the ABC Family show Kyle XY. She portrayed Hillary for three years until the show was canceled in 2009 after three seasons. Simmons also had a recurring role in the short-lived comedy series About a Girl. Simmons continued her film roles in Good Luck Chuck alongside Dane Cook and Jessica Alba. The film was critically panned. Simmons portrayed Lindsay Lohan in the television film Paparazzi Princess: The Paris Hilton Story. In 2010, Simmons had a small role as a lotus eater in Percy Jackson & the Olympians: The Lightning Thief. The film grossed $226,497,209 worldwide, making it the highest-grossing film Simmons has appeared in to date. Simmons also starred in the critically well received and award-winning comedy-horror film Tucker & Dale vs Evil.

Simmons landed a regular role on The L.A. Complex as Alicia Lowe, "a sensitive, aspiring dancer from Regina who will do whatever it takes to make ends meet." The show premiered on the Canadian network MuchMusic on Jan. 10, 2012. and aired in the U.S. on The CW. Simmons became a guest star during the shows second season and final season.

Simmons provided the voice for the character Liz Ramsey in the children's animated television show Action Dad which is yet to premiere. At the end of 2012, Simmons had appeared in one episode on the CBS sitcom How I Met Your Mother, before guest starring on an episode of Hannibal in 2013, in which she reprised her role as Gretchen Speck whom she portrayed in the short lived series Wonderfalls. Simmons appeared as Kayla in the horror sequel See No Evil 2 released direct to DVD in October 2014.

Filmography

Film

Television

Television films

References

External links

 
 

1982 births
Actresses from Vancouver
Canadian child actresses
Female models from British Columbia
Canadian film actresses
Canadian television actresses
Living people
20th-century Canadian actresses
21st-century Canadian actresses